This is a list of Slugterra episodes, a Canadian animated television series created by Asaph Fipke. The series is produced by the Canadian animation studio Nerd Corps Entertainment.

Series overview

Episodes

(2012–2013)

(2013–2014)

(2013–2015)

(2014–2015)

(2015)

(2016) 

Lists of television episodes